Nowghan may refer to:
 Nowghan-e Olya
 Nowghan-e Sofla